Schuby was an Amt ("collective municipality") in the district of Schleswig-Flensburg, in Schleswig-Holstein, Germany. The seat of the Amt was in Schuby. In January 2008, it was merged with the Amt Silberstedt to form the Amt Arensharde.

The Amt Schuby consisted of the following municipalities:

Hüsby 
Lürschau 
Schuby

Former Ämter in Schleswig-Holstein